Manuel Costas Arce (1820–1883) was a Peruvian politician. He served as the first vice president from 1872 to 1876. 

He served as the President of the National convention in 1855, and President of the Senate in 1883.

References

1820 births
1883 deaths
Presidents of Peru
Vice presidents of Peru
Presidents of the Senate of Peru
Presidents of the Congress of the Republic of Peru